The Western Association was the name of five different leagues formed in American minor league baseball during the 19th and 20th centuries.

The oldest league, originally established as the Northwestern League in 1883, was refounded as the Western Association on October 28, 1887.  It began operations in the 1888 season and lasted through the 1891 season.

A separate Western Association was formed in January 1894 with clubs in Iowa, Nebraska, Illinois and Missouri – with a team in faraway Denver, Colorado, added in 1895. This league ceased operations in 1898, but was revived again for the following season.  It was renamed the Central League in 1900.  In 1901, two leagues were called the Western Association.  One had eight teams in Ohio, Michigan, Kentucky, West Virginia, and Indiana; it folded after only one year. The other loop, confusingly located in the same geographic area, was the former Interstate League; it reverted to its original identity in 1902.

The most long-lived Western Association played between 1905 and 1954. Originally the Missouri Valley League, it existed for 42 years during that half century, suspending operations during both world wars and for one season (1933) during the Great Depression. It was largely a Class C circuit, meaning it was a lower minor league, above only the Class D level.

Cities represented 1888–1891, 1893–1899, 1901
Bloomington, IL: Bloomington Blues 1899
Burlington, IA: Burlington Spiders 1895; Burlington Hawkeyes 1896, 1898; Burlington Colts 1897
Cedar Rapids, IA: Cedar Rapids Bunnies 1896–1899
Chicago, IL: Chicago Maroons 1888
Columbus, OH: Columbus Senators 1901
Davenport, IA: Davenport Onion Weeders 1888
Dayton, OH: Dayton Veterans 1901
Denver, CO: Denver Grizzlies 1889–1890; Denver Mountaineers 1891; Denver 1895
Des Moines, IA: Des Moines Prohibitionists 1888–1890, 1894–1897
Duluth, MN: Duluth Whalebacks 1891
Dubuque, IA: Dubuque 1895–1899
Fort Wayne, IN: Fort Wayne Railroaders 1901
Grand Rapids, MI: Grand Rapids Woodworkers 1901
Indianapolis, IN: Indianapolis Hoosiers 1901
Jacksonville, IL: Jacksonville Jacks 1894; Jacksonville 1895
Kansas City, MO: Kansas City Blues 1888; 1890–1891; Kansas City Cowboys 1893
Lawrence, KS: Lawrence Farmers 1893
Lincoln, NE: Lincoln1890; Lincoln Rustlers 1891; Lincoln Treeplanters 1894–1895
Louisville, KY: Louisville Colonels 1910
Marion, OH: Marion 1901
Milwaukee, WI: Milwaukee Brewers 1888, 1890–1891; Milwaukee Creams 1889
Minneapolis, MN: Minneapolis Millers 1888–1891
Omaha, NE: Omaha Omahogs 1888–1890; Omaha Lambs 1891; Omaha Omahogs 1894–1895
Ottumwa, IA: Ottumwa Giants 1898–1899
Peoria, IL: Peoria Distillers 1894–1896; Peoria Blackbirds 1897–1898
Quincy, IL: Quincy Ravens 1894–1895; Quincy Bluebirds 1896; Quincy Little Giants 1897; Quincy 1898–1899
Rock Island, IL & Moline, IL: Rock Island-Moline Islanders 1894, 1898–1899
Rockford, IL: Rockford Forest City 1895–1897; Rockford Roughriders 1899
Springfield, IL: Springfield 1895
St. Joseph, MO: St. Joseph Clay Eaters 1889; St. Joseph Saints 1893; St. Joseph Saints 1894–1898
St. Louis, MO: St. Louis Whites 1888
St. Paul, MN: St. Paul Apostles 1888–1891
Sioux City, IA: Sioux City Cornhuskers 1888–1891
Toledo, OH: Toledo Mud Hens 1901
Topeka, KS: Topeka Populists 1893
Wheeling, WV: Wheeling Stogies 1901

1905 League
Teams in Joplin, Missouri, Leavenworth, Kansas, Sedalia, Missouri, Springfield, Missouri, and Topeka, Kansas joined from the Missouri Valley League.  Teams from Guthrie, Oklahoma, and Oklahoma City, Oklahoma joined from the Southwestern League. A new team in Wichita, Kansas formed and joined the league.

1905

1906
The teams in Guthrie and Sedalia folded. The St. Joseph, Missouri team moved from the Western League. A new team in Webb City, Missouri formed and joined the league. The St. Joseph team, with a record of 16–24, moved to Hutchinson, Kansas, on July 12, where their record was 39–60.

1907

1908
The Leavenworth team folded, and a new team in Enid, Oklahoma, formed and joined the league.

1909
Topeka and Wichita moved to the Western League. Oklahoma City moved to the Texas League. Hutchinson moved to the Kansas State League. Bartlesville, Oklahoma, and Muskogee, Oklahoma, joined from the Oklahoma–Kansas League. New teams in Guthrie, Oklahoma, and Pittsburg, Kansas formed and joined the league. The Joplin team, with a record of 20–43, moved to El Reno, Oklahoma on July 4, where their record was 16–46. The Webb City team, with a record of 35–39, moved to Sapulpa, Oklahoma on July 18, where their record was 29–20.

1910
The Pittsburg and Springfield teams folded. New teams in Joplin, Missouri, and Tulsa, Oklahoma, formed and joined the league. The Muskogee and Tulsa teams both folded on July 22, and the Bartlesville and El Reno teams both folded on July 31.

1911
The teams in Enid and Guthrie folded. New teams in Coffeyville, Kansas, Fort Smith, Arkansas, Independence, Kansas, Muskogee, Oklahoma, and Tulsa, Oklahoma formed and joined the league. The Joplin and Springfield teams folded May 10, the Coffeyville and Independence teams June 14, and all other teams and the league itself on June 19.

1914 League
New teams in Fort Smith, Arkansas, Joplin, Missouri/Webb City, Missouri, McAlester, Oklahoma, Muskogee, Oklahoma, Oklahoma City, Oklahoma, and Tulsa, Oklahoma formed and created the new league.

1914
Joplin-Webb City, with a record of 22–46, moved to Guthrie, Oklahoma on July 10, where they had a record of 2–10, and then to Henryetta, Oklahoma on July 22, where they had a record of 11–36.

Oklahoma City beat Muskogee 4 games to 2 for the championship.

1915
Henryetta folded. Teams from Denison, Texas, and Paris, Texas, joined from the Texas–Oklahoma League. A new team formed in Sherman, Texas, and joined the league.

Oklahoma City beat Muskogee 4 games to 3 for the championship.

1916

Denison beat Tulsa 4 games to 2 for the championship.

1917
Paris, with a record of 16–12, moved to Ardmore, Oklahoma, on May 10, where they had a record of 41–86.

All teams, and the league itself, folded.

1920 League
New teams in Chickasha, Oklahoma, Drumright, Oklahoma, Enid, Oklahoma, Fort Smith, Arkansas, Henryetta, Oklahoma, Okmulgee, Oklahoma, Pawhuska, Oklahoma, and Springfield, Missouri were formed. The new American Association was formed. The team with the best record in the first half of the season played against the team with the best record in the second half of the season for the championship.

1920

Enid and Okmulgee tied 3 games to 3 in the championship round.

1921

Chickasha beat Fort Smith 4 games to 3 for the championship.
Springifled beat Independence (of the Southwestern League) 2 games to 1
Ardmore (of the Texas–Oklahoma League) beat Chickasha 2 games to none

1922
Chickasha moved to the Oklahoma State League. Drumright folded. The team from Joplin, Missouri joined from the Western League, and a new team in McAlester, Oklahoma formed and joined. The Pawhuska team folded on August 16, forfeiting the remainder of their games.

1923
The team from Ardmore, Oklahoma joined from the Texas–Oklahoma League.  The team in McAlester folded July 19, and the Henryetta team folded July 21.

Ardmore beat Okmulgee 4 games to 2 for the championship.

1924
Ardmore moved to the Oklahoma State League, and Enid moved to the Southwestern League. Teams from Bartlesville, Oklahoma, Hutchinson, Kansas, Muskogee, Oklahoma, and Topeka, Kansas, joined from the Southwestern League. The Bartlesville team, with a record of 19–23, moved to Ardmore, Oklahoma on June 8, where their record was 56–59. The Joplin team, with a record of 25–24, moved to Bartlesville on June 16, where their record was 44–63.

1925
The teams in Bartlesville and Hutchinson folded. Topeka moved to the Southwestern League. A new team in Independence, Kansas, formed and joined the league.

Ardmore beat Muskogee 4 games to 1 for the title.

1926
The team in Independence folded. A new team in McAlester, Oklahoma, formed and joined the league. Ardmore moved to Joplin, Missouri on July 14. The teams in McAlester and Muskogee folded on July 20.

1927
The team in Joplin folded. A team from St. Joseph, Missouri, joined from the Western League, and one from Topeka, Kansas joined from the Southwestern League. A new team in Muskogee, Oklahoma, formed and joined the league. The team in St. Joseph, with a record of 38–32, moved to Joplin on July 7, where their record was 35–28.

1928
The team in Okmulgee folded, and a new team in Independence, Kansas, formed and joined the league.

Joplin beat Independence 4 games to 2 for the title.

1929
Topeka moved to the Western League. A new team in Shawnee, Oklahoma, formed and joined the league. The Muskogee team moved to Maud, Oklahoma, on August 22.

1930
The Maud team moved back to Muskogee, Oklahoma.

The Independence Producers played the first Night game in the history of Organized Baseball.

Independence beat Joplin 5 games to 4 for the title.

1931
The Shawnee team folded. A new team in Bartlesville, Oklahoma formed.

1932
The Joplin team, with a record of 2–1, moved to Topeka, Kansas, on May 6, where their record was 36–37. The Independence team, with a record of 12–10, moved to Joplin, Missouri, on May 23, where their record was 7–10, to Independence, Kansas, again on June 10, where their record was 4–12, and finally to Hutchinson, Kansas, on July 20, where their record was 35–36. The Muskogee team, with a record of 18–16, moved to Hutchinson, Kansas, where their record was 19–32, on June 8, and folded on July 18. The Fort Smith team, with a record of 23–29, moved to Muskogee on July 1, where their record was 25–51. The Topeka team folded July 18.

Springfield beat Bartlesville 5 games to 4 for the title. The Atchinson and Springfield teams moved to the Western League. The Belleville and Muskogee teams, and the Western Association itself, folded.

1934 League

The new League and all six member teams were created. The season was broken into halves, with the first half and second–half winners competing in the championship. The founding teams were in Bartlesville, Oklahoma; Hutchinson, Kansas; Joplin, Missouri; Muskogee, Oklahoma; Ponca City, Oklahoma; Springfield, Missouri; and rumor had it Tahlequah, Oklahoma (the Indians) played special games with the league teams in the duration of the 1930s, but was not officially part of the 1930s Western Association.

1934

Ponca City defeated Springfield in a one-game playoff for the first-half title. Springfield defeated Ponca City 4 games to 3 for the league title.

1935
Springfield changed their name to the "Cardinals".

Ponca City beat Springfield 5 games to 4 for the championship.

1936

Ponca City won the title over Joplin 5 games to 2.

1937

Joplin beat Muskogee 4 games to 3 and Springfield beat Hutchinson 3 games to 1 in the first round of playoffs. Springfield beat Joplin 4 games to 3 for the title.

1938
New teams in Fort Smith, Arkansas and Salina, Kansas were formed.

Ponca City beat Fort Smith 3 games to 1, and Hutchinson beat Springfield 3 games to 2, in the first round of the playoffs. Ponca City beat Hutchinson 4 games to 1 for the championship.

1939
Ponca City moved to St. Joseph, Missouri. Bartlesville folded. A new team formed in Topeka, Kansas.

1940

Fort Smith beat Muskogee 3 games to none, and St. Joseph beat Topeka 3 games to 1, in the first round of the playoffs. St. Joseph beat Fort Smith 3 games to none for the championship.

1941
On June 3, the St. Joseph Ponies (10–22) moved to Carthage, Missouri and became the Carthage Browns and an affiliate of the St. Louis Browns. They had a record of 30–74 in Carthage, and ended in last place.

1942
The two teams with the worst records of the previous year, Carthage and Salina, folded. The league returned to a 1st-half vs. 2nd-half winners championship format.

Fort Smith beat Topeka 4 games to 3 for the title.

1943–1945
The League suspended play because of World War II.

1946
Springfield moved to St. Joseph. New teams formed in Leavenworth, Kansas and Salina, Kansas. Because of the playoff format, the team with the best overall record, the newly formed Leavenworth Braves, did not qualify for the playoffs.

Hutchinson beat Fort Smith 4 games to 2 for the title.

1947
The playoffs format was changed again this year.

Muskogee beat Salina 3 games to 2, and St. Joseph beat Topeka 3 games to 2, in the first round of the playoffs. St. Joseph beat Muskogee 4 games to 3 for the championship.

1948
The Hutchinson Cubs moved to Springfield, Illinois on July 21. Their record after the move, of 18–45, was worse than their record in Hutchinson, 25–42. No playoff system is known of for this year, so presumably the best overall record is the league champion.

1949
Springfield moved back to Hutchinson again, changing their name and losing their affiliation. This season, St. Joseph had the best winning percentage in the history of this incarnation of the league. Perhaps coincidentally, Leavenworth had the worst winning percentage in the history of this version of the league in the same year.

1950
Leavenworth, who ended the previous year with the all–time worst winning percentage in this incarnation of the league, folded. Fort Smith moved to Enid, Oklahoma and a new club from Springfield, Missouri joined.

1951
Springfield folded, and a new team started up in Fort Smith.

1952
This year, the league returned to the 1st-half winner vs. 2nd-half winner playoff format.

1953
Salina folded, having made the playoffs only once in its seven years of existence. The Fort Smith Indians changed their name to the Fort Smith–Van Buren Twins, and a new team started in St. Joseph, Missouri with a bang.

St. Joseph beat Joplin and Hutchinson beat Topeka in the first rounds of the playoffs by 3 games to zero each. Hutchinson beat St. Joseph for the championship 4 games to 1.

1954
After having changed its name and finishing with the worst record in the league the previous season, Fort Smith folded. New teams started up in Blackwell, Oklahoma, Iola, Kansas, and Ponca City, Oklahoma.

Blackwell beat Topeka 3 games to zero, and St. Joseph beat Muskogee 3 games to 2 in the first round of the playoffs. Blackwell beat St. Joseph 4 games to 1 for the title. After the season, Blackwell joined the Sooner State League, and the other seven teams, and the league itself, folded.

The Western Association prospered during the minor league baseball boom that followed World War II, with its clubs in Topeka, Kansas, and St. Joseph, Missouri, drawing over 100,000 fans and most of its eight clubs tied to major league farm systems. But the bust that followed in the early 1950s, caused by the Korean War, the advent of television, and a retrenchment in MLB farm systems, also buffeted the WA. It finally disbanded after the 1954 season, its champion Topeka club, a Chicago White Sox affiliate, drawing half the number of fans the team had drawn during the late 1940s.

References
Johnson, Lloyd and Wolff, Miles, ed., The Encyclopedia of Minor League Baseball. Durham, North Carolina: Baseball America, 1997.
Sumner, Benjamin Barrett.  Minor League Baseball Standings:All North American Leagues, Through 1999.  Jefferson, N.C.:McFarland. 

Defunct minor baseball leagues in the United States
1888 establishments in the United States
1894 establishments in the United States
1901 establishments in the United States
1905 establishments in the United States
1934 establishments in the United States
Baseball leagues in Missouri
Baseball leagues in Oklahoma
Baseball leagues in Kansas
Baseball leagues in Arkansas
Baseball leagues in Texas